Philippe Nakellentuba Ouédraogo (born 25 January 1945) is a cardinal of the Catholic Church from Burkina Faso. He is the archbishop of Ouagadougou.

Biography and education
He was born on 25 January 1945 in  Konéan. He was ordained a priest in the diocese of Kaya in 1973.

He received his primary education at École Publique, Kaya, 1952 to 1959; secondary studies at Petit Séminaire de Pabré, Ouagadougou, 1959 to 1967. He then attended the Grand Séminaire Régional de Koumi, Bobo-Diulasso, where he studied philosophy and theology from 1967 to 1973. He was sent to Rome to the Pontifical Urbaniana University, Rome, 1979 to 1983, where he obtained a doctorate in canon law. After finishing his studies, he returned to Kaya.

Episcopate

He was appointed bishop of Ouahigouya on 5 July 1996 and consecrated on 23 November 1996 by Jean-Marie Untaani Compaoré, Archbishop of Ouagadougou. He has been archbishop of Ouagadougou since 13 May 2009.

Cardinal

Pope Francis made him a cardinal on 22 February 2014 and assigned to him the titular church of Santa Maria Consolatrice al Tiburtino.

He was appointed a member of the Congregation for Divine Worship and the Discipline of the Sacraments, Congregation for Evangelization of Peoples, and Pontifical Council for Inter-religious Dialogue.
Cardinal Ouedraogo was diagnosed with COVID-19 on March 30, 2020 but has recovered from the virus since.

See also

Cardinals created by Francis

References

External links

 
 Philippe Nakellentuba Ouédraogo

1945 births
Living people
Pontifical Urban University alumni
21st-century Roman Catholic archbishops in Africa
Cardinals created by Pope Francis
Burkinabé Roman Catholic archbishops
Burkinabé cardinals
Members of the Congregation for Divine Worship and the Discipline of the Sacraments
Members of the Congregation for the Evangelization of Peoples
Members of the Pontifical Council for Interreligious Dialogue
Roman Catholic bishops of Ouahigouya
Roman Catholic archbishops of Ouagadougou